Achyronia may refer to:

 Achironia Steudel, a synonym of Aspalathus L.
 Achyronia Boehmer, a synonym of Aspalathus L.
 Achyronia O. Kuntze, a synonym of Aspalathus L.
 Achyronia Van Royen ex L., 1758, a synonym of Aspalathus L.
 Achyronia Wendl., 1798, a synonym of Liparia L.